Monica Gaylord (born 6 February 1948) is a Canadian pianist and harpsichordist.

Born in New York, Gaylord received a bachelor's and master's degree in music from Eastman School of Music. She moved to Canada in 1970 and became the orchestral pianist for the Toronto Symphony Orchestra and the National Arts Centre Orchestra. She appeared as a soloist with the Hamilton Philharmonic, the Victoria Symphony Orchestra, and the Calgary Philharmonic. She taught at the Royal Conservatory of Music from 1986 to 2005, co-authoring the school's piano workbooks.

References

Living people
1948 births
Canadian classical pianists
Canadian women pianists